Kani Sur Rural District is a rural district (dehestan) in Namshir District, Baneh County, Kurdistan Province, Iran. At the 2006 census, its population was 6,307, in 1,205 families. The rural district has 27 villages.

References 

Rural Districts of Kurdistan Province
Baneh County